The 2015–16 American Athletic Conference men's basketball season took place between November 2015 and March 2016. Practices began in October 2015, with conference play beginning in December, and the season ended with the 2016 American Athletic Conference men's basketball tournament at the Amway Center in Orlando, FL. The season was the third since the split of the original Big East Conference into two separate leagues.  The tournament had only 10 teams, as SMU is serving a postseason ban due to academic fraud and unethical conduct

Preseason
At the 2015 American Athletic Conference media day on October 27, the conference released announced coaches predictions for standings and All-Conference teams

See Also: Men's Basketball Media Day October 27 In Orlando

2015-16 Preseason Coaches' Poll
 SMU (8) 98
 Connecticut (2) 87
 Cincinnati (1) 84
 Tulsa 76
 Memphis 59
 Temple 54 
 Houston 48
 East Carolina 31
 UCF  30
 USF 20
 Tulane 11

(First-Place Votes)   Points

Preseason All-AAC Teams

† denotes unanimous selection

 American Athletic Preseason Player of the Year: Nic Moore, G, SMU
 American Athletic Preseason Rookie of the Year: Jalen Adams, G, CONN

Rankings

AAC regular season

Conference matrix

Postseason

American Men's Basketball Championship

  March 10–13, 2016 at the Amway Center in Orlando, Florida

* SMU is banned from postseason play due to academic fraud and unethical conduct

NCAA tournament

National Invitation tournament

Honors and awards

All-Americans

All-AAC awards and teams

NBA Draft
The following list includes all AAC players who were drafted in the 2016 NBA draft.

References